Little Pine is an unincorporated community in Little Pine Township, Crow Wing County, Minnesota, United States, near Emily. It is along Crow Wing County Road 1 near County Road 106. The Little Pine River flows nearby.

References

Unincorporated communities in Crow Wing County, Minnesota
Unincorporated communities in Minnesota